The Persepolis angular-toed gecko (Cyrtopodion persepolense) is a species of gecko, a lizard in the family Gekkonidae. The species is endemic to Iran.

Geographic range
C. persepolense is found in Fars Province in southwestern Iran.

References

Further reading
Nazarov, Roman A.; Ananjeva, Natalia B.; Rajabizadeh, Mehdi (2010). "Two New Species of Angular-Toed Geckoes (Squamata: Gekkonidae) from South Iran". Russian Journal of Herpetology 16 (4): 311-324. (Cyrtopodion persepolense, new species).

Cyrtopodion
Reptiles described in 2010
Geckos of Iran
Endemic fauna of Iran